The Agreste is an area in Brazil.

It may also refer to:

 Adrien Agreste, a fictitious character from Miraculous: Tales of Ladybug & Cat Noir
 Gabriel Agreste, Adrien's father
 Agreste, an alternative name for the wine grape Malbec

See also 

 Agrestes, legendary pagan king of Camelot
 "Argestes" 6th episode of the 2nd season of Succession